Butts Up or Wall Ball is a North American elementary school children's playground game originating in the 1950s or earlier.. It is slightly similar to the game Screen Ball, and began in the 1940s or 1950s as a penalty phase of various city street games. Butts Up is played with a ball (such as a tennis ball, handball, or racquetball) on a paved surface against a wall, with a variable number of participants—usually more than three and often likely to exceed ten. Butts Up tends to be played during recess, before or after school. . Popular in New England is another frequent variation of wallball that usually differs a lot from the more widely known 'Butts Up'.

Players determine the variations of the game prior to start of play. Some of the rules of the game very loosely resemble the rules of baseball and racquetball.

Names
There are many alternate names for butts up, including "Butt Ball" and "Fireball".

Basic game
Players line up facing a wall, one of them throwing a tennis ball or similar-sized ball against it. If the thrower fails to catch the ball on its return, they must run and attempt to touch the wall - if another player can grab the ball and "hit them in the butt" with it before they reach the wall, the runner is out of the game until the next round. The game continues until two or three players remain.

Variations

In some variations of the game, there is no specific object of the game. Play continues until time runs out. In this variation, when players are "out" three times, they must lean against the wall and wait to be hit by the ball ("Butts Up"). 

The first player, usually the tennis ball owner, starts the game or "breaks the ice" (see terminology below) by throwing the ball against the wall with the objective of having the ball hit the wall without hitting the ground first or if someone catches the ball in the air before it hits the ground and yells ”poison” and throws the ball at the wall before the thrower touches the wall he’s out.

Under some rules players must hit the wall rather than the runner to eliminate them, or may hit either.

If the ball is caught before hitting the pavement, the thrower is penalized with one "out", much like baseball. Some refer to this as a "cobra", or "ace". After three outs a player leaves the game. Sometimes alternate words, such as "wall," are used instead. In some cases, such as in New York City, the catcher has to "peg" the thrower, while the thrower tries to touch the wall, if the thrower misses, the throwers doesn't get an out.

If the thrower's ball bounces before hitting the wall, the thrower must run to the wall and touch the wall before an opponent can pick up the ball and throw it to the wall. If the original thrower doesn't make contact with the wall before the ball reaches the wall, the original thrower is out. If the thrower reaches for the ball and makes contact with it before dropping it, this counts as missing the throw, and the thrower must run to the wall.

If a player catches the ball far from the wall, other players can yell "beartrap", which freezes the thrower in place. They can either throw the ball from where they are, or risk their chances by throwing the ball up or in front and run to the wall. If they don't make it to the wall in time, they are out. 

In one variation of the game, a runner who does not reach the wall before the thrown ball hits must, in addition to receiving an out, stand facing the wall and allow the thrower to "peg" him or her with the ball (usually with all possible force).

In another variation, a player who is  "out" three times must lean against the wall while other players take turns throwing the ball at them, until the out player is hit.

In the "three–out elimination", the game continues until all but one player have received three outs and left the game.

In New York City, the game is usually called "Asses Up", and the game is played exactly the same, the only major difference is that when ever a kid is "out", or doesn't touch the wall before the ball or is hit with the ball by another player, instead of eliminated after three "outs", they get eliminated when they complete the word "Asses Up" with each "out" is a letter in the game (I.e. A-S-S-E-S-U-P). This is similar with spelling out "Horse" in Basketball. Also, the term "Reach" is used when a catcher is far away, and the ball is usually thrown at the thrower as an alternative to "pegging" (usually when smaller kids are playing).

In a variation practiced widely in Santa Clara County, California elementary schools as late as the mid-1980s, each time a player earned an out, that player's "butt was up," and they would have to stand with hands against the wall, waiting to be pegged by the player who threw them out. If the player is hit in the "target area", they are convicted of the out, and gets a letter (B-U-T-T, for example), and leave the game. In this variation, at the ice breaker's discretion, play may pass by number, i.e., Player 1 breaks the ice, then Player 2 must retrieve and throw the ball, followed by Player 3, etc. In more physical games, the ball is not required to bounce after touching the wall, and aggressive players will stand near the wall, within arms' reach, pegging other players and quickly touching the wall, then retrieving the ball and throwing the other player out. Other rules included "handsies", which prohibits players from touching the ball with both hands at once (the ball could be tossed in the air and caught with the other hand, but typically a great show was made of this feat in order to avoid even the appearance of a foul). Also, a player with ball in hand must keep one foot planted at all times, or, in the interest of fairness, if a player was stranded well beyond throwing or relay distance (see "Savies"), that player could take one large step toward the wall. If a player knowingly mishandles the ball and thus must "hit the wall," and deliberately "spikes" the ball to avoid being sent out, the offending player's butt is automatically up; at the other players' discretion, they may each take a turn at throwing that player out. The attack does not cease simply because a pegger has successfully scored in the target area; each player throws nonetheless, usually with intent to cause injury or disfigurement.

In one variation of the game played in Huntington Beach, California, if the game has been going for a long time, the last two players enter "Sudden Death" mode, where additional rules are added. A player must catch the ball before it bounces, or they are eliminated. If the ball hits the wall above a certain area, then the thrower is out. In nearby Palos Verdes, California, players must alternate between catching with the right hand and the left hand, in order to avoid any bias against left-handed players.

In more recent variations of the game, a player only receives an out if they actually hit by the peg, rather than receiving it for having to be on the wall. Also, if a player wins without having gotten an out, the win is called a 'lockdown'.

In New England, specifically the Tri-State Area, another version of Wall Ball was invented. In this variation two or more people line up to take turns hitting the ball. The ball must bounce first, then hit the wall, then bounce; the next person in line must hit the ball before its second bounce on the ground, then the ball must hit the wall, then bounce. This repeats for however many people there are. It is usually played with three outs, but the number could vary depending on the number of people. There are also many variations in each school, but the overall premise is usually the same. Wall Ball in New England is usually considered a separate game from Butts Up. In some areas in Westchester county, this variant is called "Watermelon", which is named for the legal action of going completely under the ball as a hit.

In a Maryland version of wallball, the icebreaker starts the game, with all other players nearby. Players are allowed to catch the ball if it has not bounced, as well as catching other players' throws. Failing to catch the ball, taking too long to get a handle on the ball or any other type of "bobbling" is the "bobblers" cue to touch the wall. If a player is relatively far from the wall while holding the ball, other players may call "wallball" (hence the name), meaning the player with the ball has ten seconds to hit the wall, without moving or bouncing the ball off the ground. An out player must stand on the wall and get pegged by the player who got them out. If the peg is successful (player hit), play continues with the icebreaker throwing the ball first. If the peg is unsuccessful (player not hit), other players have the opportunity to get the thrower out. No penalty besides pegging occurs from an out. Fouls include kicking the ball, preventing a player from getting you out (kicking or throwing the ball after bobbling as opposed to dropping it), tampering with a throw or interfering with a peg (interference can also occur if a player running to touch the wall is obstructed by another player.) Interference is determined by the other players in the game.

Yet another playground version of the game (popular in southern Arizona) simply had all the participants apart from the first player line up against the wall, with the immediate goal of the first player to hit a participant with the ball (typically as hard as possible) and thus make that participant "it".  This version resembles dodge ball but with the wall limiting the possible dodging moves to two dimensions rather than three.  Any participant who strayed too far away from the wall during play was "punished" by a penalty shot, where the thrower would aim solely at him or her and throw the ball as hard as possible, although a hit in this case did not make the person "it".  When a player became "it" by legal means, that player assumes the role of thrower.  The object of this game—like many other playground games—was simply to inflict pain on classmates, and was thus often played in relatively obscure or off-limits areas of the playground.

Another version of wallball is that the ball is catchable off the wall and the catching player can move about freely as long as they throw the ball within the next few seconds. If the ball bounces very far away from the wall the other players may call "challenge" to the player with the ball. A call of challenge means the player may not move and must throw the ball and try to hit the wall. If the player chooses to drop the ball at their feet then the player is automatically out. The thrower, however, may choose to simply throw it at an object that would cause the ball to be hard to get before the thrower can be thrown out, possibly causing a successive number of challenges until a suitable throw has been made. If a player catches the ball they may run to the wall and place both their off hand and foot on the wall and call "bulldog." If the player does this they can freely throw the ball at whomever they wish. If they hit another player then the hit player must touch the wall before they are thrown out. "Bulldogs" are usually frowned upon by other players and considered a cheap way of getting other players out. If a player has committed a double touch another player may call the foul and is allowed a throw at the person. The offending player must be "spread eagle" as it is called, against the wall and may not move. The thrower is not allow a full force throw unless the person moves or flinches as it is usually taken from a short distance. This can either result in a peg or a double throw depending on the rules. If the thrower makes a full force throw without the offender moving then the thrower must be pegged by the original offender. In some games the thrower on "spread eagle" must touch the wall or they too will be out, unless they missed and hit the wall.

In Australian schools, most notably in Victoria and New South Wales, a variation, similarly called Fumble, is played. This game is indeed similar to Butts Up, but the main differences include:
Players can also get out if they are hit by the ball. If a player was to have a ball thrown at them, then that player, as well as the player who threw the ball, must run to the wall before the ball hits the wall. 
If the ball hits the ground before it hits the wall, the player must touch the wall before the ball does. This is because the ball becomes anyone's ball, and therefore anyone can pick it up and throw it off the wall.
If you get out, you are placed in a waiting list. The first person to get out will be replaced by the person that gets out after him.
The ball is a normal handball, but can be varied, but usually it is a bouncy ball, that can repel off a wall at high speed.

Of course, the rules vary per match and per school. Between all the schools, the variations shown are generally what are the most basic variations.

One little-known version of the game popular at schools in some areas of Toronto is called "redeye."  Redeye, also called redass, or “Celery” involves throwing the ball at the wall and having to run to the wall in all circumstances.  The other players try to throw the ball and have it touch the wall before the previous thrower makes it to the wall.  If they do succeed in beating the thrower to the wall, the thrower is out and "gets a letter."  The letter he gets depends on how many times he has gotten out.  The letters spell out either R-E-D-E-Y-E or R-E-D-A-S-S.  So if it's first out, he gets an R, second, E, third D, &c.  Last one to get all letters, wins.

Terminology

Black Mail or Reach: (Some variations) Once the ball is caught (usually from a long distance) any player may yell "Black Mail!" The player with the ball must now throw the ball to the wall without moving feet.
Break the Ice: To start the game by making the first throw regardless of ball ownership.
 Savies or Taxis or Relay: If a player feels he is too far from the wall to throw the ball and make wall contact, the thrower can throw the ball to another player and hope the receiver will wait until the thrower has run to the wall and touched it. However, Savies can backfire if the catcher betrays the thrower (or mis-times) by throwing the ball to the wall before the thrower has run and touched the wall. Normally, if the catcher drops the ball both players must run to the wall and hope to make it before being thrown out. Players are then individually ruled out, or safe. If the ball never makes it near the catcher or never touched it, then he has no obligation to throw it to continue play, unless he is the closest player.  In some places, there is no betrayal aspect as, if you save them they don't have to run.  
Chicken Drops: An alternative to Savies. If a player is too far from the wall to make a complete pass to hit the wall, he can drop the ball at his feet and head to the wall as quickly as he can to make contact. If another player picks up the ball that player can throw the runner out by getting the ball to the wall before the runner. This technique is frowned upon by Butts Up enthusiasts.  If a player attempts a Chicken Drop but the ball is not dropped where standing, he can also be ruled out by a verbal majority.
Double Touch: The act of a player touching the ball twice, resulting in an automatic out. Typically this occurs when the ball is bobbled or tripped over.
Handsies: (Some variations) The act of a player touching the ball with both hands at once, resulting in an obligation to "hit the wall".
Hit the Wall: Alternative terminology for a player's obligation, upon committing "handsies," "chicken drops," "traveling," or other offense, failure to accomplish which before any other player has thrown the player out by causing it to hit the wall results in an out or the runner's butt being "up".
Over the Wall: (Some variations) If the ball is thrown over the wall, it is considered an automatic out.  The ball must then be retrieved in a game time-out by a volunteer, usually by throwing the ball back over the wall and play immediately restarted (time-in) with the next throw by a player, as if the ball had never left play.  The volunteer walks or jogs back into the game and resumes playing as quickly as possible.
Peg: A player throws the ball at another player, usually resulting in an out for both players.
Self-Out: A player throws the ball to the wall and then catches it before the ball hits the pavement. This rule is optional and can be determined by the players prior to the start of the game.
Self-Peg: A thrower's ball bounces off the wall and hits the thrower. In this case the thrower must run to the wall and touch the wall before an opponent picks up the ball and throws it to the wall.
Stripping: In more physical iterations of the game, a player may attempt to strip the ball from the hand of another player. If successful, both players must run to the wall to avoid earning an out.
Tie Goes to the Runner: If there is a dispute among the players about whether a runner is safe or out, and the decision for and against is a 50/50 tie among players, the runner stays in the game.
Traveling: The act of a player moving both feet with ball in hand.
Lockdown: Occurs when a player wins the game without having gotten out.
Poison: When someone catches the ball without the ball hitting the ground. If they say "poison" the "poisoned" person must run to the wall before the person who caught the ball throws it to the wall.
Beartrap: Freezes the thrower in place.
In the Australian schoolyard variation, the following are also included in the list of terminology used:
Fumbled: Yelled out when a player has fumbled the ball.
Truce: Said to another player when they want to give them the ball due to distance.
Full: Yelled out when the ball has been caught on the full by another player.
Run to the Wall, Run to the Wall: Yelled out when people have touched the ball
Shoddy/Dibs service: Yelled out at the beginning of a game when a player wants to throw first
Peg: Denotes when a player intentionally throws the ball at another player, usually requiring both players to hit the wall prior to another player doing so.
Blocker: If another player blocks the thrower and the ball rebounds off the player, then both the thrower and blocker need to run to the wall.
Lost ball: If the ball is lost in a drain or a car park, then the thrower must go and get it, no matter how perilous it is.
Near Miss: If the ball comes close to hitting another person not playing the game, the thrower is warned.

References

Bailey, Guy. The Ultimate Playground & Recess Game Book (Educators Press 2001)

Further reading

See also
Wallball
Chinese Handball
American Handball
Pinners

Children's games
Street games
Ball games
Games of physical skill
Wall and ball games
Physical education